Scattered Pieces: Live is the second live album by singer-songwriter Shawn McDonald on Sparrow Records.

Track listing
 Ramblings of a Beggar  – 3:26
 I Am Nothing  – 7:04
 Don't Walk Away  – 2:30
 Take Hold  – 4:50
 Pride  – 3:59
 Simply Nothing  – 4:02
 Pour Out  – 2:28
 Free  – 3:39
 Shadowlands  – 2:36
 Home  – 3:40
 Hush  – 6:46
 Here I Am  – 5:01
 Amazing Grace  – 1:47
 The Rider On the White Horse  – 2:18
 Gravity  – 3:37
 Take My Hand  – 3:17
 Beautiful  – 4:57

Downloadable bonus tracks:
 I Am Nothing
 Pour Out

Album Credits
 Shawn McDonald – Vocals, Guitar and Harmonica
 Neal Dahlgren – Lap Steel, Pedal Steel and Harmonica
 Craig Paulsen – Percussion (Cajon, Rainstick, Djembe, Shakers and cymbals) and Harmonica
 Alli Rogers – Background Vocals
 Neal Vickers – Cello, Electric Guitar, Acoustic Guitar, Keys, Harmonica and Background Vocals
 Ian Fitchuk – Additional Musician
 All songs written by Shawn McDonald except:
 "Free" written with Will Hunt
 "Home" and "Gravity" written with Christopher Stevens
 "Take My Hand" written with Paul Wright
 "Amazing Grace"
 A&R: Christopher York
 Mixed by Justin Loucks
 Live Sound Engineer: Kirk Dahlgren
 Live Recording Engineer: Neal Dahlgren
 Mastering by Bob Boyd at Ambient Digital
 Digital Editing by Kevin B. Hipp
 A&R Administration: Jess Chambers

Notes
 Tracks 5, 9, 11, and 13 are new songs.
 Tracks 1–2, 4, 7–8, 10, and 14 are from Ripen.
 Tracks 3, 6, 12, and 15–17 are from Simply Nothing.
 The bonus tracks are from his Sony Connect sessions.
 "Amazing Grace" is a cover of the traditional hymn.

References

Shawn McDonald albums
2007 live albums
Sparrow Records live albums